The mountain mouse-warbler (Origma robusta) is a species of bird in the family Acanthizidae.  It is found in Indonesia and Papua New Guinea, where its natural habitat is subtropical or tropical moist montane forests.

This species was formerly placed in the genus Crateroscelis, but following the publication of a molecular phylogenetic study of the scrubwrens and mouse-warblers in 2018, it was moved to the genus Origma.

Taxonomy
Origma robusta includes the following subspecies:
 O. r. peninsularis - (Hartert, 1930)
 O. r. bastille - (Diamond, 1969)
 O. r. diamondi - (Beehler & Prawiradilaga, 2010)
 O. r. deficiens - (Hartert, 1930)
 O. r. sanfordi - (Hartert, 1930)
 O. r. robusta - (De Vis, 1898)

References

Origma
Birds described in 1898
Taxonomy articles created by Polbot
Taxobox binomials not recognized by IUCN